Salomé Haller (born 11 April 1975) is a French operatic and concert soprano.

Life 
Born in Strasbourg, Haller began her vocal training in her hometown and completed it at the Conservatoire de Paris. Since the beginning of the 2000s, she has made successful appearances as a singer.

References

External links 
 
 Salomé Haller on Bach Cantatas Website
 Salomé Haller at Grand Théâtre de Bordeaux
 Discography on Discogs
 Short Biography on Opera online
 St Matthew Passion with Salomé Haller (YouTube)

1975 births
Living people
Musicians from Strasbourg
Conservatoire de Paris alumni
French operatic sopranos
French performers of early music
Women performers of early music
21st-century French singers
21st-century French women singers